The Republic of Peru has two vice presidents, the First Vice President and the Second Vice President, who are elected along with the President in democratic elections. Their only constitutional mission is to replace the President in case of death, permanent or temporary incapacity, resignation, being abroad without the permission of Congress, failure to return from abroad at fixed time, and/or dismissal or removal from office as allowed by the Constitution. They cannot be appointed outside of general elections.

The First and Second Vice Presidents are first and second in the presidential line of succession. The leader of Congress, the President of the Congress, follows the First Vice President and the Second Vice President in the line of succession.

In modern Peruvian history, two Vice Presidents have acceded to the presidency after the President could no longer serve, Martín Vizcarra and Dina Boluarte. The 32nd First Vice President Martín Vizcarra assumed the office of the presidency in 2018 after the graft scandal that led to the resignation of President Pedro Pablo Kuczynski. The 33rd First Vice President Dina Boluarte assumed the office of the presidency in 2022 after President Pedro Castillo attempted to dissolve Congress and was impeached and removed from the presidency.

Historically, the position was one of a sole Vice President, which was in place in the years 1829–1831 and 1858–1862. The dual positions of First and Second Vice Presidents have been in place since 1862.

The office of the First Vice President is currently vacant, the most recent First Vice President having been Dina Boluarte. The office of the Second Vice President is also currently vacant, the most recent Second Vice President having been Mercedes Aráoz.

History

Vice President 
The position of Vice President of Peru appeared for the first time in the Constitution of 1823:"ARTICLE 76: There will be a Vice President in whom the same qualities concur. He/she will administer and withhold Executive Power in event of the death, resignation, or impeachment of the President, or when the president is unable to control the armed forces." Constitution of 1823

The Constitution of 1828 and the Life Constitution of 1826 also proposed only one vice president, who had to be appointed by the president. In the Constitution of 1834, the office was disbanded until the Magna Carta of 1856, which reinstated the sole vice-presidency.

First Vice President and Second Vice President 
The Constitution of 1860 established two vice-presidents, elected jointly with the President.Article 89: "There will be two Vice Presidents of the Republic, named first and second, who will be elected at the same time, with the same qualities and for the same period as the President. Constitution of 1860In the Constitution of 1867, the power of vice-presidents was eminently curtailed. However, this constitution held in place for a short period until a successful revolution of that same year restored the Constitution of 1860.

Similarly, the Constitution of 1920 abolished the positions of vice-presidents. The Constitution of 1933 failed to change this, but the office was eventually restored by the second presidency of Óscar R. Benavides, by law on 1 April 1936. In 1939, via plebiscitary consultation, a constitutional amendment was made restoring the office of vice president and second vice president.

The 1993 Constitution and the current constitution in force — put forth by President Alberto Fujimori — recognizes the double vice-presidency in the Executive Branch.

In recent history, there have been two instances where the First Vice President has acceded to the presidency after the President could no longer serve. The 32nd First Vice President Martín Vizcarra assumed the office of the presidency in 2018 after the graft scandal that led to the resignation of President Pedro Pablo Kuczynski. The 33rd First Vice President Dina Boluarte assumed the office of the presidency in 2022 after President Pedro Castillo attempted to dissolve Congress and was impeached and removed from the presidency. No Second Vice President has recently acceded to the presidency.

Current officeholders 

The office of the First Vice President is currently vacant. The most recent First Vice President is Dina Boluarte, who held the office until 7 December 2022 after President Pedro Castillo's self-coup d'état attempt and removal from the presidency. The office of the Second Vice President is also currently vacant.

The most recent Second Vice President is Mercedes Aráoz, who held the office until her resignation was accepted by Congress on 7 May 2020. Earlier, on 30 September 2019, the Peruvian Congress had been in the midst of the 2019 Peruvian constitutional crisis and named Aráoz as Acting President after having declared President Martín Vizcarra unfit for office. Given that Congress had itself been dissolved earlier that day by President Vizcarra and that Aráoz supported the Vizcarra's call for new congressional elections, she irrevocably resigned as Second Vice President on 1 October 2019, to leave Vizcarra as the sole claimant to the presidency. Aráoz's resignation was not accepted until 7 May 2020, by a newly elected Congress.

List of vice presidents of Peru

See also
List of current vice presidents

References

External links 
 

Government of Peru
Peru
 
1823 establishments in Peru